Gradski Stadion Kavadarci (Macedonian Cyrillic: Градски Стадион Кавадарци) is a multi-use stadium in Kavadarci, North Macedonia. It is used mostly for football matches and is currently the home ground of GFK Tikvesh. The stadium was built in the late 1940s and the first match played was on 19 March 1950 between FK Tikvesh and NK Rudar Trbovlje from Slovenia, qualification for the Yugoslav Third League, the final score was 1–4 for the visitors from Slovenia.

 

The stadium has hosted the first ever Macedonia U-21 international fixture, a 7–0 win over Estonia U-21 played on 31 May 1994, and also the Macedonian Cup final between FK Sileks and FK Sloga Jugomagnat (4–1) on 28 May 1997.

Although used primarily for football, the stadium has hosted many concerts in the past as well.

The expansion of the new South Stand is now underway, and work is expected to be completed by the summer of 2023. Once development is completed will result in a further 1000 covered seats and improved facilities.

References and notes

External links
Stadium Profile 
Kavadarci 
Macedonian Football 
Football Federation of Macedonia 

Football venues in North Macedonia
Stadium
Sport in Kavadarci